Big Brother: Over the Top (or BBOTT for short) is a spin-off American reality television series of the show Big Brother that aired exclusively online. The show premiered on September 28, 2016, and ended after 65 days with a season finale on December 1, 2016, only on CBS All Access, an over-the-top subscription streaming service. The spin-off was officially announced by CBS on August 3, 2016, while Big Brother 18 was still in progress.

As with the televised series, the group of contestants—referred to as HouseGuests—are enclosed in the Big Brother House under constant surveillance of cameras and microphones. Each week a HouseGuest was evicted until the final three HouseGuests remain on finale night. Unlike in Big Brother, the viewers voted to crown a winner. Julie Chen hosted the season premiere and finale, and conduct weekly eviction interviews. In the season finale, the voting public awarded Morgan Willett with the $250,000 grand prize over Jason Roy and Kryssie Ridolfi.

What separated this from the main televised series was the fact that the live feed was emphasised in this series, with significantly less feed blockage. For example, the live feed showed the house guests moving in and meeting one another, something that had never been shown live or unedited. Additionally, viewers got to see all the games's ceremonies and competitions from start to finish, which are rarely shown on the live feed for the main series, save for occasional Endurance competitions. Additionally, the involvement of the viewers was greatly increased, with several regular weekly “America's Vote” voting occurring each week.

Development
The season was officially announced on August 3, 2016, by CBS while the eighteenth season was still in progress. The series continued to air on the CBS television network during the summer while the fall edition aired exclusively on the over-the-top streaming service CBS All Access which has been the broadcaster of the live Internet feeds since the seventeenth season. The season would utilize the same production team from past seasons with executive producers Allison Grodner and Rich Meehan for Fly on the Wall Entertainment in association with Endemol Shine North America. Julie Chen, who has been the host of the series since its inception, would also be part of this season. However, Robyn Kass, who has cast the program since the second season, would not cast this season. The shortest season since Big Brother 10, the season only lasted nine weeks. This was the first edition of the Big Brother franchise to air live exclusively online around the world and the second season overall to air only online after the first Chinese season, which was pre-recorded and aired at a later date in 2015.

Broadcasts
There was no television coverage for this season; instead, it would be completely streamed online at CBS All Access. There were weekday replays that would be scheduled to transmit on Mondays, Tuesdays, Thursdays and Fridays at 10:00pm ET/7:00pm PT that summarized the events of the previous day in the House. On Wednesdays starting at 10:00pm ET/7:00pm PT, there was a weekly recap episode followed by the live eviction with the Head of Household competition shortly after the eviction. On Thursdays, Julie had a live Q&A with the HouseGuests and interview the recently evicted HouseGuest. Special episodes aired on Tuesdays and Fridays at 10:30pm ET/7:30pm PT after the weekday replay where viewers can watch live diary room sessions. Have Nots for the week were shown on Saturdays at 4:00pm ET/1:00pm PT with the weekly safety ceremonies shown on Saturdays and Sundays at 10:00pm ET/7:00pm PT with the weekly nominations revealed live on Sundays.

While the live Internet feeds did not have any scheduled blackouts, slanderous statements and singing of copyrighted music would be blocked for legal reasons. For the first time in the history of the program the HouseGuests entered the house one by one live on the Internet feeds after host Julie Chen introduced the audience to the program and short introductory videos were shown.

Format

The format of this season varied slightly from previous seasons that have aired on CBS. The contestants referred to as "HouseGuests" are sequestered in the Big Brother House with no contact to or from the outside world. Each week, the HouseGuests take part in several compulsory challenges that determine who will win food, luxuries and power in the house. At the start of each week, the HouseGuests compete in the Head of Household (HoH) competition. The winner of the HoH competition is immune from eviction and will select two HouseGuests to be nominated for eviction.

Each week, six HouseGuests are selected to compete in the Power of Veto (PoV) competition: the reigning HoH and the nominees are guaranteed to play with the remaining slots being given to other HouseGuests selected by random draw. The winner of the PoV competition wins the right to either revoke the nomination of one of the nominated HouseGuests or leave them as is. If the veto winner uses this power, the HoH must immediately nominate another HouseGuest for eviction. The PoV winner is also immune from being named as the replacement nominee.

On eviction night, all HouseGuests must vote to evict one of the nominees, with the exception of the nominees and the Head of Household. This compulsory vote is conducted in the privacy of the Diary Room. In the event of a tie, the HoH must break the tie publicly. The nominee with the most votes is evicted from the house.

Changes in format

Safety Ceremony
The Nomination Ceremony from the broadcast edition was replaced with the new Safety Ceremony. This ceremony took place over two days with two separate ceremonies. During the ceremony, the HoH was sequestered in the HoH room while the other HouseGuests were downstairs with their "Block Pass". When instructed by Big Brother, the HoH activated the "Block Pass" of a HouseGuest of their choosing. This made the pass illuminate green and indicate that the HouseGuest is safe from nominations.

The first ceremony takes place on Saturday night with the HoH being instructed to save a predetermined number of HouseGuests. The second ceremony takes place on Sunday night with the HoH being instructed to save all but two of the remaining non-safe HouseGuest. The HouseGuests who do not have their "Block Pass" activated at the end of the second ceremony are the HoH's two nominees.

America's Vote
This edition featured greater participation from the viewing public than the broadcast edition. Each week, the American public was given several opportunities to affect the game:
America's Nominee: Each week, the viewers voted on a third nominee who was nominated with the HoH's nomination. No HouseGuest can be nominated by America in back to back weeks and, should America's Nominee be vetoed, no replacement nominee would be named, with only the HoH's two nominees facing the eviction vote.
America's Eviction Vote: Each week, the viewers voted between the nominated HouseGuests for who should be evicted. This vote counted as one eviction vote and would be tallied with the HouseGuest's eviction votes. As with all eviction votes, the result of America's Eviction Vote would not be revealed to the HouseGuests.
America's Care Package: Each week, the viewers voted to give one HouseGuest per week a special power or "care package". This twist was first seen on Big Brother 18.
America's Have-Nots: Each week, the viewers voted for three HouseGuests to be the Have-Nots of the week.
America's Winner: For the first time since Big Brother 1, the viewers voted for the winner among the three finalists, meaning that there would be no jury of evicted HouseGuests.

HouseGuests

12 of the 13 HouseGuests were announced on September 26, 2016, including a pair of sisters, Alex and Morgan Willett. The 13th HouseGuest was announced to be returnee from the original series. Two HouseGuests were voted on by the public and Jason Roy from the Big Brother 17 was chosen to re-enter the house.

Other potential HouseGuest
The final 13th HouseGuest was chosen by a public vote between two HouseGuests from the broadcast version: Jason Roy from Big Brother 17 and Jozea Flores from Big Brother 18.

Future Appearances 
Morgan Willett has appeared on two MTV shows, Ex on the Beach and The Challenge: War of the Worlds. Monte Massongill also appeared on the second season of Ex on the Beach as Morgan's ex.

Episodes

America's Care Package
Each week, voters would choose which of the HouseGuests would receive a special power. As on Big Brother 18, all Care Packages were revealed to the public upon the commencement of the first vote. The HouseGuests were made aware of this twist, though the weekly rewards were left unspecified until the package was dropped in the backyard for public unboxing. Once a HouseGuest receives a Care Package, they are ineligible to receive another one until all other remaining HouseGuests have received one. During week 8, no voting for "The Final Four Challenge" Care Package took place, as all HouseGuests remaining had received a Care Package, except for Justin. Thus, the Care Package was awarded to him.

America's Have-Nots
The HouseGuests were chosen by America's vote; the week's Head of Household was automatically exempted from the vote, as were the previous week's Have-Nots. During Week 6, no Have-Not voting took place as only three houseguests were eligible as Have-Nots. Shelby won Head of Household, Jason received the Co-HoH care package, and Justin, Kryssie, and Whitney were ineligible as the previous Have-Nots.

Voting history

In this edition, America voted to nominate one HouseGuest each week in addition to the Head of Household's nominations. This nomination is shown in bold. If that nominee were to be saved by the Power of Veto, there would not be a replacement nomination. America would also have a vote to evict one of the nominated HouseGuests each week, the nominee that receives the most votes from America would gain one extra eviction vote in addition to the votes cast against them by their fellow HouseGuests.

Notes

References

External links
 CBS Official Site

2010s American reality television series
2016 American television seasons
2016 American television series debuts
2016 American television series endings
American television spin-offs
Big Brother (American TV series) seasons
Paramount+ original programming
Reality television spin-offs
Television series by Endemol
Television shows filmed in Los Angeles